Glucose phosphomutase may refer to:
 Phosphoglucomutase (glucose-cofactor), an enzyme
 Phosphoglucomutase, an enzyme